In sewing and patternmaking, ease is the amount of room a garment allows the wearer beyond the measurements of their body. For example, if a man has a 40-inch chest measurement, a jacket with a 40-inch chest would be very tight and would constrict movement. An ease of 3 or 4 inches might be added to the pattern (making a 43-44 inch chest), or more to enhance comfort or style. Ease is not generally included in sizing measurements. To use the example again, a man with a 40-inch chest will likely buy a jacket advertised as size 40, but the actual measurements of the garment will almost always be somewhat larger.

Ease is most important for woven garments cut on the straight or crossgrain, because fabric in this orientation has little or no stretch. This is in contrast to woven garments cut on the bias and knit garments, both of which can stretch to accommodate movement.

A sloper pattern or block pattern is a simple pattern with very little or no ease made for the purpose of fitting the body accurately, from which more finished or stylized patterns may be developed.

Adding ease
Several techniques can be used to add ease to a pattern. The simplest may be to add width to the pattern pieces, such as at the side seams. Pleats or gathers may also be used. Reducing the intake of darts will also add ease.

Contouring
Contouring is the process of fitting a pattern to the body more nearly than the sloper, but it is not the same as removing ease. Contouring removes extra space within the measurements of the wearer. For example, a dress sloper will span the bust points, but a more fitted or 'contoured' bodice may dip toward the breastbone in between the breasts and fit each breast more closely, possibly even supporting each with boning. Contouring techniques can also be applied to other concave parts of the body which may be spanned by the sloper, such as the underside of the buttocks, or the knee area for pants.

See also
Cut

References

Sewing